The 200th Street station was a local station on the demolished IRT Third Avenue Line in the Bronx, New York City, near the New York Botanical Garden. The station was opened on October 4, 1920, and had three tracks and two side platforms. It was also one block south of the Botanical Garden New York Central Railroad station. The next stop to the north was 204th Street. The next stop to the south was Fordham Road–190th Street. The station was closed on April 29, 1973, along with the rest of the IRT Third Avenue Line.

References

External links 

Railway stations in the United States opened in 1920
Railway stations closed in 1973
1920 establishments in New York City
1973 disestablishments in New York (state)
IRT Third Avenue Line stations
Former elevated and subway stations in the Bronx
Bedford Park, Bronx